The 26th Saturn Awards, honoring the best in science fiction, fantasy and horror film and television in 1999, were held on June 6, 2000.

Below is a complete list of nominees and winners. Winners are highlighted in bold.

Winners and nominees

Film

Television

Programs

Acting

Special awards

George Pal Memorial Award
 Douglas Wick

Life Career Award
 George Barris
 Dick Van Dyke

President's Award
 Richard Donner

Service Award
 Jeffrey Walker

References

External links
 Official website

Saturn Awards ceremonies
1999 television awards
1999 film awards